Peter Simpson Hedges (born July 6, 1962) is an American novelist, playwright, screenwriter, film director and film producer.

Early life 
Hedges was born in West Des Moines, Iowa, where he was raised, the son of Carole (Simpson), a psychotherapist, and the Rev. Robert Boyden Hedges, an Episcopal priest. His mother left when he was young so he was raised by his single father. He attended Valley High School, where he was involved in the theater department, including the improvisational group and the mime troupe, The Bakers Dozen. He later went to the North Carolina School of the Arts, where he studied drama.

Career 
Hedges' novel What's Eating Gilbert Grape was adapted into a critically acclaimed movie of the same title, for which he wrote the screenplay, launching his film career.

In 2002, he was nominated for an Academy Award for Best Adapted Screenplay for About a Boy, alongside Chris and Paul Weitz. In the same year, he wrote and directed Pieces of April, starring Katie Holmes, which he dedicated to his mother.

In 2007, he co-wrote and directed Dan in Real Life.

He wrote and directed The Odd Life of Timothy Green (2012), a film conceived by Ahmet Zappa, produced by Zappa and Scott Sanders, and released by Walt Disney Pictures. In 2018, he wrote and directed the drama Ben Is Back, about drug addiction, starring his son Lucas Hedges, and Julia Roberts.

His latest novel The Heights was published March 4, 2010 by Dutton.

Personal life 
His wife is Susan Bruce (Titman), a poet. They have two sons; Simon, who works in private equity  in New York, and actor Lucas Hedges.

Filmography
 What's Eating Gilbert Grape (1993) (writer)
 A Map of the World (1999) (writer)
 About a Boy (2002) (writer)
 Pieces of April (2003) (writer and director)
 Dan in Real Life (2007) (co-writer and director)
 The Odd Life of Timothy Green (2012) (co-writer and director)
 Ben Is Back (2018) (writer, director and producer)

Plays
 Oregon (1984)
 Champions of the Average Joe (1985)
 The Age of Pie (1986)
 Andy and Claire (1986)
 Teddy by the Sea (1986)
 Imagining Brad (1988)
 Baby Anger (1993)
 Good as New (1995)

Novels
 What's Eating Gilbert Grape (1991)
 An Ocean in Iowa (1998)
 The Heights (2010)

References

External links

1962 births
20th-century American novelists
21st-century American novelists
American male novelists
American male screenwriters
Living people
Writers from Des Moines, Iowa
University of North Carolina School of the Arts alumni
20th-century American male writers
21st-century American male writers
Novelists from Iowa
Film directors from Iowa
Screenwriters from Iowa